Carex curvula, the Alpine sedge (a name it shares with other members of its genus), is a species of flowering plant in the genus Carex, native to the Pyrenees, the Alps, the Carpathians, and the mountains of the Balkans. It has gone extinct in Germany. It propagates almost exclusively clonally, with some of its clonal colonies estimated to be 2,000 years old.

Subtaxa
The following subspecies are currently accepted:
Carex curvula subsp. curvula
Carex curvula subsp. rosae Gilomen

References

curvula
Flora of Europe
Plants described in 1785